Heterelmis is a genus of beetles in the riffle beetle family Elmidae.

Species include:
Heterelmis comalensis
Heterelmis glabra
Heterelmis obesa
Heterelmis obscura
Heterelmis stephani
Heterelmis tarsalis
Heterelmis vulnerata

References

Byrrhoidea genera
Elmidae